WWKL (106.7 FM) is a commercial radio station licensed to serve Hershey, Pennsylvania. Owned by Cumulus Media, it broadcasts a contemporary hit radio format.

History
Originally WMSH-FM, the station changed its call sign to WRKZ and branded as "Z107" with a country format in 1980.

On February 19, 2004, the station changed its call sign to WCPP and rebranded as Coolpop after over 24 hours of playing "Pop Goes the Weasel" on a continuous loop. Many rumors circulated in the community to explain the loop, including rumors of a staff member taking hostages and locking him/herself in the studio and playing the loop. This proved false when the new format launched with "Hey Ya!" by Outkast.

The original airstaff of Coolpop included only one live show, "Michelle & Mitchell" in the morning, while the midday and afternoon shifts were voicetracked by talent from Citadel Broadcasting Company sister station 93Q in Syracuse, New York. As of Spring, 2004, a full line up of live talent was hired. Sarah Vaughn on middays and Justin Louis on afternoons were added to the already live morning show.

Coolpop was marketed as "The World's First Coolpop Station", mixing a standard Mainstream CHR format along with some 1970s and 1980s "Cassette Classics" (later renamed "Coolpop Classics").

Coolpop also alternated theme weekends every other weekend. Some theme weekends included "One Hit Wonders", "Diva Doubleplays", "Coolpop Classics", and the very popular 1970s themed "Studio 106.7".

In early fall 2004, Michelle & Mitchell were replaced with Ed Coffey and Amy Warner, the long running morning show from Harrisburg's WTPA-FM, who had been fired from that station earlier in the summer.

On July 1, 2005, Coolpop was quietly replaced with an Adult Hits format branded as Mix 106.7.

On April 9, 2010, Mix 106.7 was flipped to Channel 106.7, and was reformatted with a 1980s and 1990s Hits/Gen X format.

Citadel merged with Cumulus Media on September 16, 2011.

The Gen X format was dropped on January 20, 2012 at 1:06pm as the station became Z Country 106.7. The last song on Channel 106.7 was Bye Bye Bye by *Nsync, and the first song on Z Country 106.7 was This Is Country Music by Brad Paisley.

On February 3, 2014, at 12 noon local time, WZCY-FM, along with 9 other Cumulus owned country music stations, made the switch to the Nash FM branding as Nash FM 106.7. The final song on Z Country 106.7 was Prayin' for Daylight by Rascal Flatts, while the first song on Nash FM 106.7 was How Country Feels by Randy Houser.

On March 15, 2018, at 2PM, WZCY-FM flipped to contemporary hit radio as Hot 106.7, as part of a format swap with WWKL Hot 93.5 (which concurrently took on the Nash FM branding and a gold-based country format). The last song on Hot 93.5 was “Young Dumb & Broke” by Khalid, while the first song on Hot 106.7 was "Finesse" by Bruno Mars and Cardi B This move was intended to reduce signal overlap and redundancy with sister country station WIOV-FM, which serves the Lancaster, York, and Reading metropolitan areas, while also using its stronger signal to be more competitive with iHeartMedia's competing WHKF in Harrisburg. iHeartMedia subsequently responded by flipping WHKF to alternative rock and redirecting its listeners to sister station WLAN-FM/Lancaster, which similarly pivoted to serving the entirety of the market, and to take advantage of WWKL's sister station WQXA’s decision to shift from Alternative to Mainstream Rock after WTPA-FM was sold to Educational Media Foundation and flipped to K-Love in January 2018.

Signal note 
WWKL is short-spaced to four other Class B stations: WJFK-FM 106.7 The Fan (licensed to serve Manassas, Virginia), WWMX Mix 106.5 (licensed to serve Baltimore, Maryland), WCFT-FM Bigfoot Country (licensed to serve Bloomsburg, Pennsylvania), and WLTW-FM 106.7 Lite FM (licensed to serve New York City).

WJFK-FM and WLTW-FM both operate on the same channel as WWKL. The distance between WWKL's transmitter and WJFK-FM's transmitter is 96 miles, while the distance between WWKL's transmitter and WLTW-FM's transmitter is 142 miles, as determined by FCC rules. The minimum distance between two Class B stations operating on the same channel according to current FCC rules is 150 miles.

WWMX and WCFT-FM both operate on 106.5 MHz, a first adjacent channel to WWKL. The distance between WWKL's transmitter and WWMX's transmitter is 58 miles, while the distance between WWKL's transmitter and WCFT-FM's transmitter is 61 miles, as determined by FCC rules. The minimum distance between two Class B stations operating on first adjacent channels according to current FCC rules is 105 miles.

References

External links

WKL
Contemporary hit radio stations in the United States
Cumulus Media radio stations
Radio stations established in 1964
1964 establishments in Pennsylvania